Lisa Rands (born October 21, 1975) is an American rock climber. She is known for her bouldering for which in 2002, she became the first American female to win IFSC World Cup bouldering competitions, and topped the IFSC world boulder rankings in 2002. As well as making first female ascents (FFAs) of boulders such as The Mandala , Rands was the first female in history to do an E8-graded traditional climbing route, The End of the Affair (E8 6c).

Early life
Rands was born in Southern California in 1975, where she grew up.  She described herself as a "tomboy" in high school, where she initially focused on athletics and gymnastics, however, in her junior year, a boyfriend introduced her to climbing and bouldering.  Rands went on to study geology at California State Polytechnic University, and after moving to Colorado for a new job after graduating, she later returned to her native California to focus on climbing.

Climbing career

Competition climbing
In December 2001, competing in her first-ever event of the IFSC Bouldering World Cup, Rands came 2nd in the Birmingham, England stage.  In June 2002, Rands became the first American female climber to win a stage of the IFSC Bouldering World Cup, when she placed first at Lecco, Italy, beating Corine Theroux, and Sandrine Levet. In July 2002, Rands won her second major international competition coming first in the "Open des Ecrins at L'Argentiere", France's longest-running and largest bouldering competition. During 2002, Rands was ranked first in the IFSC world rankings for female bouldering.

Rands won editions of the 2001, and the 2002 Professional Climbers Association (PCA) open bouldering competition in Salt Lake City, and came second in the 2003 PCA in Salt Lake City to Alex Johnson.  Rands won the world's longest-running and largest outdoor bouldering competition, the Phoenix Bouldering Competition (PBC), three years running in 2002 (19th edition), 2003 (20th edition), and 2004 (21st edition, which became the Phoenix BoulderBlast).  In 2004, Rands won all three stages of the southeast's Triple Crown outdoor bouldering competition, and returned ten years later in 2014, to win all three stages of the Triple Crown series.

Bouldering

In January 2001, Rands completed the second female ascent, after Lynn Hill, of the classic boulder problem, Midnight Lightning graded , in Camp 4, in Yosemite; unlike Hill, Rands did not toprope the boulder in advance, and took two days to solve the problem.  In March 2001, Rands made the first female ascent (FFA) or Plain High Drifter, becoming the first-ever American female to climb a V11-graded boulder, and only the second-ever female in history to climb a  boulder after French climber  who ascended Sale gosse assis in 1998. Rand was also featured bouldering in the 2002 climbing film, Dosage Volume 1 (2002), where she discusses her preference for "big guy problems" (e.g. committing intimidating lines with powerful moves).

In July 2002, Rands climbed a second , Du Cote de Seshuan in the Magic Wood, Switzerland, and in March 2003, Rand made the third and fourth-ever female ascent in history, of an  8A/8A+ V11/V12 boulder, solving both Chbalanke and Sarah SDS on successive days at Hueco Tanks in Texas. Rands won an honorable mention in Climbing magazine's 2003 Golden Piton Awards for Bouldering, for her ascents. Her Rocklands climbs have been captured in several climbing films including Specimen (2006), and The Players (2009).

In January 2007, her ground-up ascents of intimidating highball problems in the Buttermilks such as her first female ascent of This Side of Paradise , were captured in the Sender Films climbing film, The Sharp End (2007). Her highball bouldering and her ascent of The Mandala were featured in two segments of NBC's Jeep World of Adventure Sports, with Rands saying: "Women are perfectly capable of climbing all the hard tall scary things that the guys climb... I really like to put myself out there on the line. 30 feet off the ground you really have to focus to relax yourself. You have to flip your mind back and fourth from this raw power to a very calm state".

Traditional climbing

Rands has also repeated some of the most intimidating traditional climbing routes in the sport, and particularly in the English Peak District, where she made many first female ascents, and onsights, of classic gritstone routes, often with her British husband, Wills Young.  In September 2003, Rands became only the second female in history to lead an E7-graded traditional route (the first was Airlie Anderson in 1994 on Master's Edge), when she ascended White Lines (E7 6b/c), at Curbar Edge in the Peak District.  In October 2004, she became the first female to climb an E8-graded traditional route, when she ascended Johnny Dawes' famous British gritstone test-piece (featured in Hard Grit 1998), The End of the Affair (E8 6c), at Curbar Edge.  Rands won Climbing magazine's 2004 Golden Piton Award for Traditional Climbing, for her ascent of the E8 route.  In May 2005, she completed the first female ascent of Shine On (E7 6c) at Stanage Edge. In April 2006, she returned to the Peak District, and completed the first female ascent of another Dawes' test-piece, Gaia (E8 6c), at Black Rocks. Her ascent of Gaia is captured in the Big UP Productions climbing film, Dosage Volume 4 (2006).

Rands also extended into big wall climbing, and in 2005, made a fast all-free ascent of the 20 pitch 727-metre grade IV, 5.10+ route Chiaro di Luna, on the northwest face of Aguja Saint Exupery in Patagonia.  She has also put up new traditional multi-pitch alpine routes with big wall climbing legend Peter Croft, such as Gargoyle (5.11b), and Flying Buttress (5.11a) in 2011 on Merriam Peak. In 2010, the duo climbed the 10 pitch 364-metre grade IV, 5.12d+ route The Venturi Effect on The Incredible Hulk granite wall in the High Sierras, which was captured in the film, Reel Rock 5 (2010).

Personal life
Rands lived in Bishop, California for over 14 years with her Californian-born, British-raised husband, Wills Young, who is also an extreme rock climber, rock climbing writer (for Climbing, Rock & Ice, and Outside magazines), and rock climbing guidebook writer (including Bishop Bouldering, 2007).  They moved to Chattanooga, Tennessee, where they run a climbing gym, and a climbing coaching and performance school, that Climbing magazine ranked as one of America's top 10 climbing gyms in 2016.

Bibliography
Women Who Dare: North America's Most Inspiring Women Climbers (Chris Noble), 2013, Falcon Guides. page 195–209. .

Filmography
 Rands and Peter Croft on The Venturi Effect: 
 Rands bouldering in Rocklands: 
 Rands highball bouldering in the Buttermilks: 
 Rands bouldering in Rocklands: 
 Rands climbing Gaia (E8 6c): 
 Rands bouldering in France: 
 Rands bouldering in the Buttermilks:

See also 
List of grade milestones in rock climbing
History of rock climbing
Rankings of most career IFSC gold medals
Angie Payne, American bouldering climber
Alex Puccio, American bouldering climber
Alex Johnson, American bouldering climber

References

External links
 
 

 VIDEO: Peter Croft and Lisa Rands on Venturi Effect 5.12+ on The Hulk, High Sierras Gripped Magazine (February 2021)
 

American rock climbers
Living people
1975 births
People from California
Place of birth missing (living people)
California State Polytechnic University, Pomona alumni
Female climbers
American sportswomen
21st-century American women
IFSC Climbing World Cup overall medalists
Boulder climbers